The 1955 Little All-America college football team is composed of college football players from small colleges and universities who were selected by the Associated Press (AP) as the best players at each position. For 1955, the AP selected three teams of 11 players each, with no separate defensive platoons.

Junior back Nate Clark of Hillsdale College, an African American from Benton Harbor, Michigan, was named to the first team after leading all of college football with 144 points (24 touchdowns) scored.

First team
 Back - Nate Clark (junior, 5'8", 195 pounds), Hillsdale
 Back - Gene Scott (senior, 5'11", 180 pounds), Centre
 Back - Dave Burnham (senior, 6'2", 180 pounds), Wheaton
 Back - Charles Sticka (senior, 6'0", 195 pounds), Trinity (Connecticut)
 End - Charles Schultz (junior, 6'1", 185 pounds), Alfred
 End - Richard Donlin (senior, 6'5", 205 pounds), Hamline
 Tackle - Charles Gibbons (senior, 5'8", 218 pounds), Rhode Island
 Tackle - Vincent Vidas (senior, 6'2", 215 pounds), Drexel
 Guard - Wixie Robinson (senior, 5'10", 190 pounds), Pepperdine
 Guard - Steve Myhra (junior, 6'1", 245 pounds), North Dakota
 Center - Hubert Cook (senior, 6'2", 195 pounds), Trinity (Texas)

Second team
 Back - Elroy Payne, McMurry
 Back - William Englehardt, Omaha
 Back - William Rhodes, Colorado Western
 Back - James Ztiser, Delaware
 End - George Cilek, Coe
 End - Ronald Henry, Hampden-Sydney
 Tackle - Roger Siesel, Miami (Ohio)
 Tackle - Sherman Plunkett, Maryland State
 Guard - Gerry Luth, Pacific Lutheran
 Guard - Luther Shealy, Presbyterian
 Center - William Vandersteop, Whitworth

Third team
 Back - William Hamilton, Florence State (Alabama)
 Back - Jack Schultz, Luther
 Back - Don Baker, North Texas
 Back - James Higgason, Southwest Louisiana
 End - Harry Drexler, Juniata
 End - Jack Hecker, Bowling Green
 Tackle - Joe DeKasar, Upsala
 Tackle - Allen Dunham, Texas Lutheran
 Guard - Roland Merrifield, Maine
 Guard - Tom Hofflander, Augsburg
 Center - Jerry Angell, Hobart

See also
 1955 College Football All-America Team

References

Little All-America college football team
Little All-America college football teams